is a Japanese company headquartered in Kobe that is engaged in the health care business. Originally called TOA Medical Electronics (a branch of the TOA Corporation), the Sysmex brand was established in 1978, and were mainly involved with haematology analysers. The company was renamed Sysmex Corporation in 1998 taking advantage of brand recognition of their machines.

About the company
Along with its subsidiaries, Sysmex is involved in the development, manufacture and sale of laboratory testing reagents and laboratory equipment; the development and sale of computer systems for medical institutions, as well as the development and sale of software used for clinical examination information systems.

In addition, through its associated company, Sysmex is also engaged in the sale of extracorporeal diagnostic agents, as well as the import and sale of medical devices. The company distributes its products in the domestic market and to the overseas markets including the United States, Germany, the United Kingdom, China and Singapore, among others. It has offices and factories throughout Asia, as well as branches in Europe, Canada, United States, Australia and New Zealand.  As of March 31, 2022, Sysmex had 76 subsidiaries and one associated company in total. On April 1, 2011, Katakura Industries Co., Ltd. sold its biological science research department to the company.

Global and regional headquarters
Sysmex Corporation - Global - Kobe, Japan
Sysmex America Inc - North & South America - Lincolnshire, Illinois, United States
Sysmex Canada Inc. Mississauga, Ontario, Canada
Sysmex Europe SE - Europe, Middle East and Africa - Norderstedt, Germany
Sysmex Shanghai Ltd. - China - Shanghai, China
Sysmex Asia Pacific Pte Ltd. - Asia/Pacific - Tampines, Singapore
Sysmex Korea Co., Ltd - Seoul, Korea
Sysmex Vietnam Co., Ltd - Ho Chi Minh City, Vietnam

See also

Medical technologist
Automated analyzer

References

External links
 Sysmex home page 

Medical technology companies of Japan
Companies based in Kobe
Companies listed on the Tokyo Stock Exchange
Technology companies established in 1968
Japanese brands
1968 establishments in Japan